Il Cinema Ritrovato (meaning "cinema rediscovered") is a festival dedicated to the history of cinema, screening classics, retrospectives and showcasing the latest restored films from labs and archives around the world. The majority of the films shown are from early cinema to the 1960s. It is organised every summer by the Cineteca di Bologna, Italy, and is the world's major festival of film restoration. It was founded in 1986 as a three-day event but over time it became bigger, screening 500 films over nine days in 2018.

Notes

External links
 Il Cinema Ritrovato, official site 

Film festivals in Italy
Recurring events established in 1986
Annual events in Italy
Culture in Bologna
Tourist attractions in Bologna
1986 establishments in Italy